Vytautas Šarakauskas (born 8 February 1982 in Belgrade Serbia) is a Lithuanian professional basketball player for Neptūnas-Akvaservis.

Professional career 
Šarakauskas started his career in SSK–Perlas Vilnius, which played in the LKAL league. He went undrafted at the 2004 NBA draft. In 2006, Šarakauskas moved to BC Sakalai of the LKL league. He averaged 10.8 points per game and 6.6 rebounds per game his rookie season in the league.

Three seasons later, Šarakauskas signed with BC Šiauliai. Šarakauskas soon became a starter for the team. During the 2010–11 season, he nearly averaged a double-double in both the LKL league and the BBL league. In 2012, he moved to BC Neptūnas.

In the summer of 2011, Šarakauskas led his national team to a fifth place at the 2011 World Military Basketball Championship.

Player profile 
He has averaged nearly one rebound every four minutes on the court in his entire career. Šarakauskas' field goal percentage is usually over 55% in the LKL.

References 

1982 births
Living people
BC Neptūnas players
BC Šiauliai players
Centers (basketball)
Lithuanian men's basketball players